The Patagonian canastero (Pseudasthenes patagonica) is a species of bird in the family Furnariidae.  It is endemic to Argentina.  Its natural habitat is subtropical or tropical dry shrubland.

References

Patagonian canastero
Birds of Patagonia
Endemic birds of Argentina
Patagonian canastero
Taxonomy articles created by Polbot